Denise Nyakéru Tshisekedi (born 9 March 1967) is the First Lady of the Democratic Republic of the Congo as the wife of President Félix Tshisekedi.

In March 2022 Denise Nyakéru Tshisekedi visited the Congolese National Police in Kinshasa during training with MONUSCO concerning gender mainstreaming in peacekeeping operations.

Denise's father, Étienne Nyakeru, was an "evolved", as we still said under Belgian colonization. He had a position of responsibility in the administration of what was still the unified province of Kivu. One of his sisters, Jeannette, was a diplomat in London. 

One of his brothers-in-law is “general doctor” Gilbert Kabanda Kurhenga, commander of the army health corps. She was only nine months old when she lost her father, her mother and one of her uncles in a car accident in Bukavu. Due to the premature death of her parents, she was unable to learn Mashi, her mother tongue.

References 

Living people
1967 births
First ladies of the Democratic Republic of the Congo
21st-century Democratic Republic of the Congo people